Mike Sabath is an American record producer, songwriter, and musician. He has worked with Lizzo, Meghan Trainor, Raye, Liam Payne, Little Mix, the Jonas Bros. and Selena Gomez, among other artists.

Early life and education
Sabath was born and raised in Westchester County, New York.  His parents, Karen and Bruce Sabath, were financiers.  He started to sing as a child, and learned to play piano, guitar, clarinet, and drums. In 7th grade, to benefit the charity Ability Beyond Disability, he wrote a song titled "Hand in Hand" which he recorded with a chorus of 140 kids. "Hand in Hand" raised more than $5000 for the charity through online sales and donations. A year later, he wrote, arranged and recorded "Talk About It" to raise funds for the Westchester Mental Health Association.

Sabath attended John Jay High School and as a student wrote and recorded music every night. He applied to and was accepted at Harvard, but deferred admission to focus on music full-time.

Career
Sabath took a leave of absence from high school in his senior year to write and record in Los Angeles. By then, he had a manager, Don Isaac, and an agent, who also represented Justin Bieber. In early 2017, he signed a publishing deal with Sony/ATV Publishing, and later that year attended a multi-day Sony/ATV publishing camp.  While there, he wrote "Get Loud for Me" with the singer Grizzle.  The song was used in an NFL/Bose commercial, and became a hit:  it was streamed more than 4.4 million times, and added to 67,000 playlists.  "Get Loud for Me" was later used in ads for Adidas and the Need for Speed Payback video game. He also co-wrote Daphne Willis' "Do It Like This", at the Sony/ATV camp; it  was used in commercials for Comcast/Xfinity  and became a "phenomenon" in South Korea.

In 2018, Sabath wrote and produced "Familiar" for Liam Payne's debut album, LP1. Recorded with Payne and J Balvin, "Familiar" charted at #25 in the US  and #14 in the UK, where it remained on the Top 40 charts for 19 weeks.  He had similar success in 2019 as a co-writer on "I Can't Get Enough" by Selena Gomez, J Balvin, Benny Blanco, and Tainy.

In 2019, in addition to writing and producing music with artists including Lizzo, the Jonas Brothers, Carlie Hanson and DJ Snake, Sabath co-wrote, produced, and appeared on Meghan Trainor's "Wave," the second single from her third major-label studio album, Treat Myself (2020).  He performed on Ellen and The Voice with Trainor following the single's release. He also signed with Warner Records in 2019.

In September 2020, his song "Good Energy" was selected to be in the soundtrack for the popular video game series FIFA's latest installment, FIFA 21.

Selected production discography

References

1998 births
Living people
Record producers from New York (state)
Songwriters from New York (state)
John Jay High School (Cross River, New York) alumni
Warner Records artists
Sony Music Publishing artists
People from Westchester County, New York